Muliyar is a village and Grama Panchayat and  in Kasaragod district in the Indian state of Kerala.

Geography
It is situated along State Highway 55, to the north of the Chandragiri River.

Demographics
As of 2011 Census, Muliyar village had a population of 25,095 with 12,248 males and 12,847 females. The average female sex ratio was 1049 lower than the state average of 1084. In Muliyar, 12.4% of the population was under 6 years of age. Muliyar had an average literacy of 88.7% lower than the state average of 94%; male literacy was 92.9% and female literacy was 84.8%.

See also
 Adhur
 Mulleria
 Karadka
 Delampady

References

Cherkala - Jalsoor Rd